Dobb-e Moleyhem (also Romanized as Dobb-e Moleyḩem; also known as Dobb-e Moleyḩīm, Domḩelem-e Mo‘alleh, Domleḩīm, and Domo Leḩeym) is a village in Esmailiyeh Rural District, in the Central District of Ahvaz County, Khuzestan Province, Iran. At the 2006 census, its population was 25, with 4 families.

References 

Populated places in Ahvaz County